Statistics of Bahraini Premier League in the 1956–57 season.

Overview
Muharraq Club won the championship.

References
RSSSF

Bahraini Premier League seasons
Bahrain
1956–57 in Bahraini football